Miloš Klika (3 April 1890 – 21 August 1962) was a Bohemian fencer. He competed in the individual épée and sabre events at the 1912 Summer Olympics.

References

1890 births
1962 deaths
Czech male fencers
Olympic fencers of Bohemia
Fencers at the 1912 Summer Olympics